The yellow-bellied chat-tyrant (Silvicultrix diadema) is a species of passerine bird in the family Tyrannidae. It is a chunky bird with a short, thin bill. It is mostly olive with an ochre yellow forehead and long yellow eyebrow. It has dusky colored wings and tail with two rufous tail bars. It is mostly found in Colombia, Ecuador, Peru, and Venezuela. It feeds in separated pairs hunting near the ground in foliage.

Taxonomy
The yellow-bellied chat-tyrant is a bird of the order Passeriformes which contains more than half the birds species in the world. Inside this order, the yellow-bellied chat-tyrant is of the family Tyrannidae also known as the tyrant flycatchers. These birds reside in the Americas. There are 400 species in this family. They are mostly plain colors such as brown, grey, and yellow. They tend to be strictly Insectivorous, but some will eat berries and small invertebrates. Most species share the sallying feeding technique.

Description
It is dark olive with a darker colored crown. It has an ochre yellow forehead which continues as a narrow eyebrow. It has blackish lores and greyish brown wings and tail. It also has a bright yellow belly and under-tail coverts. It has two rufous wing bars and rufous wing edgings.

Distribution and habitat
Its natural habitat's are subtropical, tropical moist montane forests, and cloud forests. They are considered uncommon to fairly common in these ranges. They like to stay in brushy hillsides in the forests of Colombia, Ecuador, Peru, and Venezuela. Though they are common, they are rarely seen because they hide in the dense mountain understory.

Behavior

Foraging
The yellow-bellied chat-tyrant is a quiet, retiring bird that tries to stay hidden at all times. They tend to flick their tails up and sally short distances in the understory while hunting insects in the foliage making audible snaps. They also will hop from twigs to the ground. They are sometimes considered fearless but typically inconspicuous, hiding in thick undergrowth. They can occasionally be found in mixed flocks, but do not follow them.

Vocalizations

In the morning (at dawn) this bird sings with a fast, thin, and delicate trill that ascends slightly like fingers running up a comb. During the day the song is a long, buzzy trill that sags in the middle then ascends at the end. There is also a longer version during the day that slowly rises then drops slightly at the end. It also has a "conflict" call that slowly rises then immediately followed is a slow descending trill over and over with other sharp bickering notes. The bird also will sing for a short time at dusk.

Breeding
They tend to breed from January–October in Colombia and March–December in Ecuador. They do not migrate, making them a resident bird. They tend to make mossy ball nests on banks containing 4 creamy white eggs.

References

Steven L. Hilty, Bill Brown. A guide to the birds of Colombia. Princeton University Press, 1971, p. 499.
Thomas S. Schulenberg. Birds of Peru. Princeton University Press, 2007, p. 463.]
Itis.gov  For Taxonomic Information
Robert S. Ridgely, Guy Tudor. Songbirds of South America: The Passerines. University of Texas Press, 2009, p. 453.]
Charles Gald Sibley, Burt Leavelle Monroe. Distribution and taxonomy of birds of the world. Yale University, 1990, p. 355.]
Steven L. Hilty, Rodolphe Meyer de Schauensee. Birds of Venezuela. Princeton University Press, 2003. p. 617.]

External links
 with range maps of the species
 with a full sound profile of the bird
 with videos, photos, and song

yellow-bellied chat-tyrant
Birds of the Colombian Andes
Birds of the Ecuadorian Andes
Birds of the Venezuelan Andes
yellow-bellied chat-tyrant
Articles containing video clips
Taxonomy articles created by Polbot